Alexander Norman Berenson (born January 6, 1973) is an American writer who was a reporter for The New York Times, and has authored several thriller novels as well a book on corporate financial filings. His 2019 book Tell Your Children: The Truth About Marijuana, Mental Illness and Violence sparked controversy, earning denunciations from many in the scientific and medical communities. 

During the coronavirus pandemic, Berenson appeared frequently in American right-wing media, spreading false claims about COVID-19 and its vaccines. He spent much of the pandemic arguing that its seriousness was overblown; once COVID-19 vaccines were rolled out, he made false claims about the safety and effectiveness of vaccines.

Early life and education
Berenson was born in New York, and grew up in Englewood, New Jersey. After attending the Horace Mann School, he graduated from Yale University in 1994 with bachelor's degrees in history and economics.

Career
Berenson joined The Denver Post in June 1994 as a business reporter. In August 1996, he left the Post to join TheStreet, a financial news website founded by Jim Cramer. In December 1999, Berenson joined The New York Times as a business investigative reporter.

In the fall of 2003 and the summer of 2004, Berenson covered the occupation of Iraq for the Times. He then covered the pharmaceutical and health care industries, specializing in issues concerning dangerous drugs. Beginning in December 2008, Berenson reported on the Bernard Madoff $50 billion Ponzi scheme scandal.

In 2010, Berenson left the Times to become a full-time novelist.  He lives in Garrison, New York, with his wife Jacqueline, a forensic psychiatrist.

He has written 12 spy novels, all featuring the same protagonist, CIA agent John Wells.  His first novel, The Faithful Spy, was released in April 2006 and won an Edgar Award for best debut by an American novelist.  The Faithful Spy was ranked #1 on The New York Times Bestseller List for paperbacks.

In 2008, Berenson released his second thriller, The Ghost War. His third novel, The Silent Man, followed in 2009.  His fourth, The Midnight House, was released in 2010 and debuted at #9 on The New York Times bestseller list. The fifth, The Secret Soldier, was released in 2011 and debuted at #6 on the bestseller list.  The sixth, The Shadow Patrol, was released in 2012, and debuted at #8.  In July 2012, The Shadow Patrol was named a finalist for the Ian Fleming Steel Dagger Award, given by Britain's Crime Writers' Association.

Opposition to cannabis legalization 
In 2019, Berenson authored the book Tell Your Children: The Truth About Marijuana, Mental Illness and Violence, which argues that marijuana use contributes to psychotic disorders and violent crime. The book "received positive coverage from the New Yorker and Mother Jones for what some called its troubling truths" but was denounced as alarmist and inaccurate in the scientific and medical communities because of his claims that cannabis  psychosis and violence; many scientists state that he is drawing inappropriate conclusions from the research, primarily by inferring causation from correlation, 
as well as cherry picking
data that fits his narrative, and falling victim to selection bias via his use of anecdotes
to back up his assertions.

COVID-19 pandemic 

Early in the 2020 COVID-19 pandemic, Berenson vocally argued that people and the media were overestimating the risk of the new virus, that it posed little risk to young Americans, and that it was being used as a cover for government overreach. Many public health experts have rejected his claims.

In May 2020, Fox News announced that Berenson would host a TV show called COVID Contrarian on its online streaming platform Fox Nation. However, by July 2020, amid surges in coronavirus cases across parts of the United States, Fox News appeared to have backtracked and removed the announcement of his show from its website.

In 2021, Berenson tweeted that COVID-19 vaccinations had led to 50 times more adverse effects than flu vaccine. PolitiFact rated the claim "mostly false". The Atlantic called him "The pandemic's wrongest man", owing to his false claims of the vaccine's ineffectiveness.

On January 25, 2022, Berenson appeared on the Fox News show Tucker Carlson Tonight declaring that existing mRNA vaccines are "dangerous and ineffective" against COVID-19, and further demanding that they be withdrawn from the market immediately. The Washington Posts Philip Bump denounced Carlson for "inviting Berenson on, despite his proven track record of misinformation and cherry-picking" and observed that "Berenson's claims went unchallenged."

Twitter suspension and reinstatement
On August 28, 2021, Twitter permanently suspended Berenson for repeated violations of its policy on COVID-19 misinformation, but after Berenson filed suit in December 2021 demanding reinstatement, Twitter reinstated Berenson's account in early summer 2022, in a "mutually acceptable resolution". This reinstatement was referred as "significant" by The Atlantic, given that most social-media-banned people fail to win their court cases. 

Berenson did not regain Twitter access because of a First-Amendment free speech claim, which was rejected by the judge.  Eric Goldman, a law professor at Santa Clara University School of Law, theorizes that Twitter settled because of documentation of promises made to Berenson by a high-level Twitter employee concerning the nature of his tweets.  Goldman stated that Internet company executives have always been advised by their attorneys not to make promises to, nor even to speak to anyone about their individual accounts “for reasons that should now be obvious.”

Books

Novels

John Wells series

Non-fiction
 
 Lost in Kandahar (audio narrative performed by the author) Brilliance Audio, 2012,  
 Tell Your Children: The Truth About Marijuana, Mental Illness and Violence, 2019, Free Press,

Awards 

 2007 Edgar Award for best first novel, for The Faithful Spy

References

External links

 Author's website
 Alex Berenson on Substack
Telegram

1973 births
Living people
People from Garrison, New York
People from Englewood, New Jersey
American spy fiction writers
American thriller writers
American non-fiction writers
The New York Times writers
Edgar Award winners
Cannabis writers
Vaccine hesitancy
COVID-19 conspiracy theorists
Yale University alumni
21st-century American novelists
21st-century American male writers
Place of birth missing (living people)